Robert Joseph Thomas (January 26, 1922 – March 14, 2014) was an American film industry biographer and reporter who worked for the Associated Press from 1944 to 2010. 

As of 2014, he was twice listed in the Guinness World Records, for the longest career as a reporter, and for the most consecutive Academy Awards shows covered by an entertainment reporter.

Biography
Thomas was born in San Diego, California in 1922. He grew up in Los Angeles, where his father worked as a publicist for Warner Bros., Metro-Goldwyn-Mayer, Paramount Pictures, and Columbia Pictures. 

Thomas first joined the Associated Press in Los Angeles in 1943, where he aspired to be a war correspondent. However, he was assigned as a correspondent in Fresno, California, where he stayed for more than a year before quitting. He returned to the Los Angeles bureau in 1944 and was appointed as their entertainment reporter. He was also told to use the name "Bob Thomas" as his birth name was thought to be too formal. There, Thomas interviewed celebrities in activities that brought out their personalities, whether by measuring their waistlines after childbirth (as he did with Betty Grable) or testing just how tall a leading lady needed to be by kissing her himself (as he did with June Haver). Acclaimed as the dean of Hollywood reporters, Thomas had been writing about the film industry for the Associated Press since the days when Hollywood was run by the men who founded it: Jack L. Warner, Darryl F. Zanuck, Harry Cohn, and Louis B. Mayer.

During his career at the AP, Thomas authored at least 30 books. Many in the film industry credit his 1969 biography of producer Irving G. Thalberg as sparking their interest in pursuing a career in film production. Other subjects also included Liberace, Joan Crawford, Marlon Brando, David O. Selznick, Walter Winchell, Bob Hope, Bing Crosby, Howard Hughes, Abbott and Costello, Ethel Merman and Walt Disney.

Personal life
He lived in Encino with his wife, Patricia. They had three daughters. Thomas, aged 92, died on March 14, 2014, at his home.

Awards and honors
For contributions to the motion picture industry, Thomas received a star on the Hollywood Walk of Fame, becoming the first author-reporter to be given this honor, which was paid for by his friends in advance and placed at 6879 Hollywood Boulevard. In 2009, in recognition of over 60 years of covering the entertainment business for the Associated Press, the Publicists Guild awarded him a Lifetime Achievement Award.

Bibliography

Nonfiction
If I Knew Then (with Debbie Reynolds)
The Art of Animation 
The Massie Case (with Peter Packer)
King Cohn
Liberace: The True Story
Thalberg
Selznick
The Secret Boss of California: The Life and High Times of Art Samish (with Arthur Samish)
The Heart of Hollywood
Winchell
Howard, the Amazing Mr. Hughes (with Noah Dietrich)
Marlon: Portrait of the Rebel as an Artist
Joan Crawford

The Road to Hollywood (with Bob Hope)
Bud & Lou: The Abbott and Costello Story
The One and Only Bing
Walt Disney: An American Original
Golden Boy: The Untold Story of William Holden
 I Got Rhythm: The Ethel Merman Story

Fiction
The Flesh Merchants
Weekend 33

For children
Walt Disney: Magician of the Movies
Donna DeVarona, Gold Medal Winner

Anthology
Directors in Action

References

External links

 The Best Walt Disney Biographies
  Section on Bob Thomas at D23

1922 births
2014 deaths
People from San Diego
University of California, Los Angeles alumni
Writers from California
American biographers
American male journalists
Journalists from California
American film historians
Film theorists
Associated Press reporters
American male biographers